Nagorny is a rural locality (a khutor) in Soldatsky Selsoviet Rural Settlement, Fatezhsky District, Kursk Oblast, Russia. The population as of 2010 is 7.

Geography 
The khutor is located on the Usozha River (a left tributary of the Svapa in the basin of the Seym), 92 km from the Russia–Ukraine border, 51 km north-west of Kursk, 11 km west of the district center – the town Fatezh, 3.5 km from the selsoviet center – Soldatskoye.

Climate
Nagorny has a warm-summer humid continental climate (Dfb in the Köppen climate classification).

Transport 
Nagorny is located 9 km from the federal route  Crimea Highway as part of the European route E105, 3 km from the road of regional importance  (Fatezh – Dmitriyev), 2.5 km from the road of intermunicipal significance  (38K-038 – Soldatskoye – Shuklino), 25 km from the nearest railway halt 29 km (railway line Arbuzovo – Luzhki-Orlovskiye).

The rural locality is situated 54 km from Kursk Vostochny Airport, 169 km from Belgorod International Airport and 245 km from Voronezh Peter the Great Airport.

References

Notes

Sources

Rural localities in Fatezhsky District